The 2014–15 Alabama Crimson Tide men's basketball team (variously "Alabama", "UA", "Bama" or "The Tide") represented the University of Alabama in the 2014–15 NCAA Division I men's basketball season. The Crimson Tide, led by 6th year head coach Anthony Grant played their home games at Coleman Coliseum in Tuscaloosa, Alabama, as a member of the Southeastern Conference. They finished the season 19–15, 8–10 in SEC play to finish in a tie for eighth place. They lost in the second round of the SEC tournament to Florida. They were invited to the National Invitation Tournament where they defeated Illinois in the first found before losing in the second round to Miami (FL).

On March 15, after losing in the SEC Tournament, head coach Anthony Grant was fired. He compiled a record of 117–85 in six seasons. Associate head coach John Brannen served as interim head coach during the Tide's two NIT games.

Off-season

Departures

Incoming transfer

Note: Redshirt senior Christophe Varidel transferred to Alabama from Chaminade during the 2014 offseason and would have been eligible to play immediately at the beginning of the 2014–15 season because he had already graduated school and had one year of athletic eligibility remaining, but due to lingering injuries from his time at Chaminade, Varidel made a joint decision with head coach Anthony Grant to end his college basketball career before the start of the season.

Class of 2014 signees

Roster

Schedule and results

|-
!colspan=12 style="background:#990000; color:#FFFFFF;"| Exhibition

|-
!colspan=12 style="background:#990000; color:#FFFFFF;"| Non-conference regular season

|-
!colspan=12 style="background:#990000; color:#FFFFFF;"| SEC regular season

|-
!colspan=12 style="text-align: center; background:#990000"|SEC Tournament 

|-
!colspan=12 style="text-align: center; background:#990000"|NIT

|-
| colspan="12" | *Non-conference game. Rankings from AP poll. All times are in Central Time. (#) during NIT is seed within region.
|}

Source: 2014–15 Schedule. Rolltide.com

See also
Iron Bowl of Basketball
2014–15 NCAA Division I men's basketball season
2014–15 NCAA Division I men's basketball rankings
2014–15 Alabama Crimson Tide women's basketball team

References

Alabama
Alabama Crimson Tide men's basketball seasons
Alabama
Alabama Crimson Tide
Alabama Crimson Tide